Benimakia rosadoi is a species of sea snail, a marine gastropod mollusc in the family Fasciolariidae, the spindle snails, the tulip snails and their allies.

Description

Distribution

References

 Bozzetti L. (2002) Due nuove specie dal Mozambico (Gastropoda: Prosobranchia: Fasciolariidae). Malacologia Mostra Mondiale 36: 3-4.
 Snyder M.A. & Vermeij G.J. (2008). Two additions to the fasciolariid genus Benimakia. Novapex 9(1): 49-51

Fasciolariidae
Gastropods described in 2002